John George Weld Weld-Forester, 2nd Baron Forester PC (9 August 1801 – 10 October 1874), was a British Tory politician. He served as Captain of the Honourable Corps of Gentlemen-at-Arms under Sir Robert Peel from 1841 to 1846.

Background
Forester, born in Sackville Street, London, was the eldest son of Cecil Weld-Forester, 1st Baron Forester, and Lady Katherine Mary Manners, daughter of Charles Manners, 4th Duke of Rutland. The Prince of Wales, later King George IV, a friend of his father, was godfather.,

Political career
Forester was elected to the House of Commons for Wenlock in 1826, a seat he held until 1828, when he succeeded his father as second Baron Forester and entered the House of Lords. In 1841 he was appointed Captain of the Honourable Corps of Gentlemen-at-Arms in the Tory administration of Sir Robert Peel, which he remained until the government fell in 1846. He was admitted to the Privy Council in 1841.

Associations with Disraeli
He was a friend of Benjamin Disraeli. Through Lord Forester's mother, another friend of Disraeli, Lord John Manners (later Duke of Rutland), a figure in Disraeli's Young England movement, was his own second cousin.

Lord Forester secured Disraeli's nomination as Tory parliamentary candidate for Shrewsbury for the 1841 General Election. Disraeli was subsequently returned as M.P., despite bitter opposition at the election, and held the seat until the 1847 General Election, when he contested and was subsequently elected for Buckinghamshire.

Later in life Disraeli, then a widower, had a simultaneous correspondence with two of Forester's sisters, the then-married Selina, Countess of Bradford and widowed Anne Elizabeth, Countess of Chesterfield.  A collection of over 1,100 letters he wrote to the former between 1875 and his death in 1881, during most of which period he was Prime Minister, are preserved at Weston Park, Staffordshire.

Other interests
Lord Forester served in the South Salopian Yeomanry Cavalry, being promoted from Lieutenant to Captain in May 1826 and as late as 1852 was in command of a troop of theirs at Wellington, Shropshire. He took part with his troop when the yeomanry were deployed to suppress the 'Chartist' riots in Montgomeryshire in 1839.

A keen fox hunter from university days, Lord Forester was Master of Fox Hounds of the Belvoir Hunt in Leicestershire, of which the Duke of Rutland's family were also members, from 1830 to 1858, and was credited with bringing competitive athletics into Shropshire by his patronage of the Wenlock Olympian Games, where he normally presented the prize cups for the tilting matches.

In 1833 Lord Forester served as treasurer of the Salop Infirmary in Shrewsbury.

Personal life
Lord Forester married on 10 June 1856, at St John's, Paddington, London, a German, Alexandrine Julie Theresa Wilhelmina Sophie, Countess von Maltzan, daughter of Joachim Carl Ludwig, Count von Maltzan of Prussia, and widow of Frederick Lamb, 3rd Viscount Melbourne, from whom she had been separated in the last years of Melbourne's life. After Lord Forester's death it was stated the couple had one son who died an infant, although this does not appear stated in standard reference works on the peerage.

Lord Forester died childless at Willey Hall in October 1874, aged 73, and was buried at Willey parish church.  His widow died in 1894. He was succeeded in the barony by his younger brother George, who was also a Tory politician.

References

External links

1801 births
1874 deaths
Barons in the Peerage of the United Kingdom
Honourable Corps of Gentlemen at Arms
Masters of foxhounds in England
Members of the Parliament of the United Kingdom for English constituencies
Members of the Privy Council of the United Kingdom
Shropshire Yeomanry officers
Eldest sons of British hereditary barons
UK MPs 1826–1830
Forester, B2